The 1993 Chattanooga Moccasins football team represented the University of Tennessee at Chattanooga as a member of the Southern Conference (SoCon) in the 1993 NCAA Division I-AA football season. The Moccasins were led by first-year head coach Tommy West and played their home games at Chamberlain Field. They finished the season 4–7 overall and 2–6 in SoCon  play to tie for seventh place.

Schedule

Roster

References

Chattanooga
Chattanooga Mocs football seasons
Chattanooga Moccasins football